Groomsville is an unincorporated community in Prairie Township, Tipton County, in the U.S. state of Indiana.

History
The area was settled by whites prior to its 1860 founding. The Liberty Baptist Church was founded in 1853 just north of the future Groomsville. Groomsville was official founded in 1860. Enoch Smith facilitated the founding of the post office. Groomsville was named after a physician and Tipton County auditor, B.M. Groom. A general store was built in Groomsville just after its founding. The store was sold to McCreary and Stoops in 1883. John W. Kern made his first political speech in the village in 1870. The post office was discontinued in Groomsville in 1900.

Geography

References

Footnotes

Sources
 Pershing, Marvin W. "History of Tipton County, Indiana: Her People, Industries and Institutions". Indianapolis: B.F. Bowen (1914).

Unincorporated communities in Tipton County, Indiana
Unincorporated communities in Indiana